Samei may be,

Samei language
Empress Samei
Adib-ol-Saltaneh Samei